Túlio Miraglia (19 January 1930 – 2003) was a Brazilian sports shooter. He competed in the trap event at the 1972 Summer Olympics.

References

1930 births
2003 deaths
Brazilian male sport shooters
Olympic shooters of Brazil
Shooters at the 1972 Summer Olympics
Place of birth missing